Matthieu Khedemi (born 15 January 1997) is a professional rugby league footballer who plays as a  for AS Carcassonne in the Elite One Championship and France at international level. 

He is the son of Mathieu Khedimi, former rugby league international for France.

In 2017 he made his Catalans debut in the Challenge Cup against Hull FC.

References

External links
Catalans Dragons profile
SL profile

1997 births
Living people
AS Carcassonne players
AS Saint Estève players
Catalans Dragons players
France national rugby league team players
French rugby league players
Rugby league hookers